Jab Harry Met Sejal is a 2017 Indian Hindi-language romantic comedy film written and directed by Imtiaz Ali. It stars Anushka Sharma and Shah Rukh Khan in their third collaboration after Rab Ne Bana Di Jodi (2008) and Jab Tak Hai Jaan (2012). Pre-production of the film begun in April 2015 and principal photography commenced in August 2016 in Prague, Amsterdam, Vienna, Lisbon and Budapest.

Jab Harry Met Sejal released on 4 August 2017 to mixed-to-negative reviews from critics and audience, with criticism for its direction, story, and screenplay, but praise for the soundtrack, cinematography, production design, costumes, and Khan and Sharma's performances. It was a box-office bomb in India, however, it was fairly successful overseas.

At the 63rd Filmfare Awards, Jab Harry Met Sejal received 2 nominations – Best Music Director (Pritam) and Best Female Playback Singer (Nikhita Gandhi for "Ghar").

Plot
Harinder "Harry" Singh Nehra (Shah Rukh Khan) is a tourist guide who works in Amsterdam. Self-described as a "cheap womaniser", he is lonely yet friendly and helpful, and often flirts with his clients, putting his job at risk.

After dropping a family at the airport, Harry comes across Sejal Zaveri (Anushka Sharma), a member of the same family who has lost her engagement ring and wants him to help her. Harry is reluctant, but to avoid a complaint by Sejal that might make him lose his job, he reluctantly agrees to help. In due course of time while searching for the ring, they become friendly and he tells her that he had left his village, Nurmahal and came to Canada to become a singer, which did not work out and that is how he slowly became a tour guide.

Both Harry and Sejal travel to places in Europe where he had initially taken the family, in search of the ring. During this, Harry ends up falling in love with Sejal, but does not reveal it to her, knowing that she is engaged to Rupen (Kavi Shastri). They soon learn that a criminal, Ghyassuddin Mohammed Qureshi "Gas" (Chandan Roy Sanyal), has stolen the ring. They go to Gas to retrieve the ring but Harry gets thrashed by Gas' men. Later, while looking for antiseptics in her bag for Harry, Sejal finds the ring and realises that the ring was in her bag all along. However, she does not tell Harry, as she wants to spend some more time with him and is falling in love with him as well.

The next day, Harry and Sejal fly to Frankfurt for the wedding between Harry's friend Mayank (Aru Krishansh Verma) and Irina (Evelyn Sharma), where both get questioned by them about their relationship, seeing their evident chemistry. After the wedding, Harry and Sejal get into an argument about it. Harry does not admit his feelings, as he feels he is not good enough for her and she decides to fly back home.

At the airport, Sejal shows Harry the ring and tells him that she found it few days ago and that it was in her bag all along. He asks her to take care and bids her goodbye.

She returns to India and he returns to his work, but begins to miss her and gets sad, not being able to concentrate during work. On Mayank's insistence, Harry flies to Mumbai to go to her wedding in hope to talk to her about his unrevealed feelings before she marries. On reaching the venue, he learns that Sejal's marriage was called off. He walks out to find her sitting outside. They eventually share their feelings for each other, kiss and go to Harry's village, Nurmahal in Punjab, where he reunites with his family and marries Sejal.

Cast 
 Anushka Sharma as Sejal Zaveri 
 Shah Rukh Khan as Harinder "Harry" Singh Nehra 
 Aru Krishansh Verma as Mayank 
 Chandan Roy Sanyal as Ghyassuddin Mohammed Qureshi (Gas)
 Evelyn Sharma as Irina
 Kavi Shastri as Rupen, Sejal's fiancé
 Baljeet Kaur Nanda as Mrs. Nehra, Harry's mother

Development 
Jab Harry Met Sejal was initially conceived about a man trying to commit suicide. However, after Khan met Ali, the former suggested to revitalise the story by making it a more jolly film.

Production of the film began in April 2016 and plans to filming were announced in the first part of August 2016, when the film had the working title "Production No. 52". Sharma required several months of diction training to prepare herself for her role, as her character is from Gujarat. She describes her character as "very superficial, doesn't have any depth as a person. There is no similarity with me. But her morals and values of self-respect are something that I can relate to. But otherwise, the character is quite impulsive by nature."

The film underwent a lot of name changes throughout its production phase from The Ring to Rahnuma to Raula until it was finalized with Jab Harry Met Sejal. When the title of the film was finally revealed, it received considerable backlash from people who accused that it must be a copy of the 1989 iconic Hollywood film When Harry Met Sally... or that it must have been inspired by it. However, contrary to popular beliefs, the two films have no similarity or connection with one another except both falls under the same genre and the two protagonist start off as strangers. Khan explained, "When Harry Met Sally... is one of the greatest love stories ever made in the history of world cinema. Our film on the other hand, is quite original, a fun space love story by Imtiaz Ali. But it is a takeoff from there as that movie is a classic. It is a way to attribute."

In an interview with The Indian Express, Khan discussed about the possible epilogue of the movie; the couple had three children and moved to a small town for some time. Sejal then works as a lawyer while Harry takes time off and writes a book. The former takes the role of a working partner while the latter looks after the children.

Filming 
Filming began in late August 2016 in Prague and continued in Amsterdam & Budapest from September 2016. Filming locations include multiple locations in Europe, as well as in Punjab.

Soundtrack

The music of the film is composed by Pritam while the lyrics have been penned by Irshad Kamil. The first song of the film titled as "Radha" sung by Shahid Mallya and Sunidhi Chauhan was released on 21 June 2017. The second song "Beech Beech Mein" sung by Arijit Singh, Shalmali Kholgade and Shefali Alvares was released on 3 July 2017. The third song "Safar" sung by Arijit Singh was released on 10 July 2017. The fourth song "Butterfly" sung by Dev Negi, Chauhan, Aman Trikha and Nooran Sisters was released on 13 July 2017. The fifth song "Hawayein" sung by Singh was unveiled on 26 July 2017. The sixth and last song titled "Phurrr" was composed by the American DJ Diplo and Pritam. It was sung by DJ Diplo, Pritam, Mohit Chauhan and Tushar Joshi and was released on 3 August 2017. The soundtrack was released by Sony Music India on 3 August 2017.

Sony Music India also make "Radha" to other language for promotional song. Sung by Shahid Mallya for All Male Version, Shashaa Tirupati for Tamil and Telugu, Shaimaa ElShayeb for Arabic and Pragya Dasgupta for Bengali. Released on 19 July 2017 until 3 August 2017. For Tamil, Telugu, Bengali also written by Irshad Kamil but Arabic Version there are additional lyrics from Maher Salah.

Reception
Debarati S Sen of The Times of India commented that they have made an "enjoyable album", "which captures the usual genres that characterises a typical Bollywood film, well enough". Joginder Tuteja of Bollywood Hungama rated 4 out of 5 stars to the album.

Release
The film was initially set for an 11 August 2017 release. However, it was later moved a week earlier to 4 August to avoid a clash with the Akshay Kumar-Bhumi Pednekar-starrer Toilet: Ek Prem Katha. Its release date in Dubai and United Arab Emirates was pushed from early Thursday morning – which has been the norm for Bollywood films – to Friday evening to prevent pirated versions of the film or its spoilers from getting leaked. However, after a backlash, it was decided to release it on its original release date, 3 August, at 6 pm GST.

The film was released on 3400 screens worldwide.

Critical reception
Anita Iyer of Khaleej Times rated the film 2.5 out of 5 stars and said, "The movie goes through its ebb and flow, and all you can do is enjoy the good bits, till they last." Manjusha Radhakrishnan of Gulf News also rated it 2.5 stars out of 5, saying "The climax isn't ground-breaking, however, the cinematography that highlights the beauty of a handful European countries is pleasing to watch."

Yahoo gave the movie 3.5 stars out of 5 calling it a complete entertainer. Koimoi gave Jab Harry Met Sejal 3.5 stars out of 5, praising the performances and direction.

The Times of India gave the movie 3 stars of out 5 and wrote, "Sound advice here would be that you actually buy yourself a tour ticket to Europe and soak in the sights for real. But, if you want to settle for a cheaper option of touring the continent inside a cinema hall, buy yourself a JHMS ticket and get transported to the land of make-believe captured indulgently by cinematographer K. U. Mohanan, with the added advantage of a Punjabi 'munda' playing your friend, philosopher, lover and guide." Filmfare Magazine gave the movie 3 stars out of 5 stating that, "JHMS is a happy romantic comedy that you can sing and dance along with. Pritam's music is a stand out feature. The performances are really strong".

NDTV gave JHMS 2/5 and wrote, "It is cinema's equivalent of a shiny bauble that glitters wholly in vain. Watch it only if you fancy a vicarious romp through Europe with an off-colour megastar trying hard to get going". Shubhra Gupta, critic of Indian Express gave JHMS 1.5 stars out of 5 stars while calling it a dud. Giving Jab Harry Met Sejal 2 stars out of 5, Hindustan Times wrote, "Lethargic storytelling kills Shah Rukh Khan-Anushka Sharma's film. It's a big disappointment to see Shah Rukh Khan returning to his comfort zone and yet not performing on top of his powers." Bollywood Hungama gave the film 2 stars out of 5 and wrote, "Jab Harry Met Sejal has its moments. But the film is riddled with cliches and flaws that takes the film down, thanks to the poor script." Rajeev Masand of News18 wrote "After successfully exploiting themes of self-discovery in Jab We Met (2007) and Rockstar (2011), it became clear watching Tamasha (2015) that Imtiaz may be running out of ideas. There are just so many times you can romanticize self-healing and coming-of-age before it all starts to feel contrived. In the case of this film, frankly Harry and Sejal come off as characters in search of a plot." Anupama Chopra of Film Companion wrote "The problem is that Imtiaz is unable to mould the larger-than-life romantic persona of Shah Rukh into his own more bruised brand of romance. Twenty-two years later, Shah Rukh is still Raj – tender, sensitive and resolutely chaste – at least with the woman he loves."

Box office
The film under-performed at the domestic box office. However, the film was an overseas success, grossing US$10 million overseas, making it the year's second highest overseas grosser among Hindi films, behind only Raees, another Shah Rukh Khan-starrer.

Domestic 
The film collected ₹15.25 crore on opening day, becoming the lowest opener for a Shah Rukh Khan film in three years. On the second day, it collected ₹15 crores, followed by its third day's collection of ₹15.5 crores, bringing its first weekend's collection to ₹45.75 crores, and making it 2017's sixth-highest first-weekend-collecting Bollywood film in the domestic market.

Nevertheless, the weekend box office collection of the film did not manage to cross ₹50 crores, and it emerged as one of the lowest openers of Shah Rukh Khan in recent years.

Overseas 

Accolades

Notes

References

External links

 
 
 
 Jab Harry Met Sejal at Bollywood Hungama
Jab Harry Met Sejal Movie Overview in Indian Language at Cineguru

2017 films
2010s Hindi-language films
2017 romantic comedy-drama films
Films set in Europe
Films set in Prague
Films set in Punjab, India
Films directed by Imtiaz Ali
Indian romantic comedy-drama films
Films distributed by Yash Raj Films
Films shot in Amsterdam
Films shot in Budapest
Films shot in Prague
Films shot in Lisbon
Red Chillies Entertainment films